Adgaon Chothava is a village in Yeola taluka (tahsil), Nashik district, Maharashtra, India.

Adgaon Chothava is 5 km from Yeola.

Agriculture

Most people of Adgaon Chothava are farmers. Popular crops are wheat and onions.

Villages in Nashik district